Rapanos may mean:
 Rapanos v. United States, a 2006 United States Supreme Court case
 Vassilis Rapanos, the Finance Minister of Greece in June 2012